Mohamed Fofana (born 7 March 1985) is a football defender. Born in France, he represented Mali at international level.

Career
Fofana spent eight years playing for Ligue 1 team Toulouse from the 2004–05 until the 2011–12 season. A highlight during his time with Toulouse was competing in 2007–08 UEFA Champions League qualifying.

On 2 August 2016, in his second league match for his new club RC Lens, a 2–2 draw against Tours, Fofana was red-carded. He was suspended for two matches.

References

External links
 
 Profile at Soccerway
 TFC.info 

1985 births
Living people
French sportspeople of Malian descent
People from Gonesse
Footballers from Val-d'Oise
Association football defenders
French footballers
Malian footballers
Toulouse FC players
Stade de Reims players
RC Lens players
Ligue 1 players
Ligue 2 players
Mali international footballers